Mansarovar is a railway station on the Harbour Line of the Mumbai Suburban Railway network.

The City and Industrial Development Corporation (CIDCO) built a bus station in 2010.

References 

Railway stations in Raigad district
Mumbai Suburban Railway stations
Mumbai CR railway division
Railway stations opened in 2008